German submarine U-992 was a Type VIIC U-boat built for Nazi Germany's Kriegsmarine for service during World War II.
She was laid down on 30 October 1942 by Blohm & Voss, Hamburg as yard number 192, launched on 24 June 1943 and commissioned on 2 August 1943 under Oberleutnant zur See Hans Falke.

Design
German Type VIIC submarines were preceded by the shorter Type VIIB submarines. U-992 had a displacement of  when at the surface and  while submerged. She had two shafts and two  propellers.

U-992 was fitted with five  torpedo tubes (four fitted at the bow and one at the stern), fourteen torpedoes, one  SK C/35 naval gun, 220 rounds, and one twin  C/30 anti-aircraft gun. The boat had a complement of between forty-four and sixty.

Service history
The boat's career began with training at 5th Flotilla on 2 August 1943, followed by active service on 1 March 1944 as part of the 3rd Flotilla. She later transferred to 11th Flotilla on 1 June 1944, then on to 13th Flotilla on 1 October 1944.

Wolfpacks
U-992 took part in seven wolfpacks, namely:
 Trutz (1 June – 10 July 1944) 
 Dachs (1 – 5 September 1944) 
 Zorn (28 September – 1 October 1944) 
 Grimm (1 – 2 October 1944) 
 Panther (20 October – 9 November 1944) 
 Stier (5 – 7 December 1944) 
 Hagen (17 – 21 March 1945)

Fate
U-992 surrendered on 9 May 1945 in Narvik.

Summary of raiding history

References

Notes

Citations

Bibliography

External links

German Type VIIC submarines
1943 ships
U-boats commissioned in 1943
U-boats sunk in 1945
World War II submarines of Germany
Ships built in Hamburg
U-boats sunk by British warships
Operation Deadlight
Maritime incidents in December 1945